Greensburg Municipal Airport  is a public use airport located two nautical miles (4 km) southwest of the central business district of Greensburg, a city in Decatur County, Indiana, United States. Owned by the Greensburg-Decatur County Board of Aviation Commissioners, it was formerly known as Greensburg-Decatur County Airport. It is included in the National Plan of Integrated Airport Systems for 2017–2021, which categorized it as a general aviation facility.

Facilities and aircraft 
Greensburg Municipal Airport covers an area of 30 acres (12 ha) at an elevation of 912 feet (278 m) above mean sea level. It has one runway designated 18/36 with an asphalt surface measuring 3,433 by 40 feet (1,046 x 12 m).

For the 12-month period ending December 31, 2017, the airport had 2,701 aircraft operations, an average of 7 per day: 99% general aviation and 1% air taxi. 
In November 2020, there were 34 aircraft based at this airport: all 34 single-engine.

See also 
 List of airports in Indiana

References

External links 
 Greensburg Municipal Airport at City of Greensburg website
 
 Aerial image as of April 1998 from USGS The National Map
 
 
 

Airports in Indiana
Transportation buildings and structures in Decatur County, Indiana